WSNC (90.5 FM) is a radio station broadcasting jazz, gospel, and talk programming. Licensed to Winston-Salem State University, United States, it serves the Piedmont Triad area.  The station is currently owned by Winston-Salem State University. The founding General Manager of WSNC FM was Dr. Clarence W. Thomas.

In November 2017, WSNC replaced a transmitter installed in the 1990s which failed in June, causing the station to operate at a tenth of normal power using rented equipment for several months.

See also
 List of jazz radio stations in the United States

References

External links
 official site
 

SNC
NPR member stations